Pentti Kuukasjärvi (born 28 November 1946) is a Finnish athlete. He competed in the men's triple jump at the 1976 Summer Olympics.

References

1946 births
Living people
Athletes (track and field) at the 1976 Summer Olympics
Finnish male triple jumpers
Olympic athletes of Finland
Place of birth missing (living people)